Hunterston Castle, West Kilbride, North Ayrshire, Scotland is the historic home of the lairds of Clan Hunter. The keep dates from the late 15th, or early 16th centuries, while the attached manor house is of the 17th century. The estate was granted to the Hunters by David I of Scotland in the 12th century, and the heads of the clan have lived on the estate for the following 900 years. The castle is a Category A listed building.

History
The original Hunters were Norman French in origin, who were granted the lands around Hunterston by King David I in the 12th century. In the Middle Ages, the chief of Clan Hunter was granted the hereditary title of Royal Huntsman. The family has owned the castle ever since, although much of the estate was compulsorily purchased by the government in the 20th century to enable the construction of the Hunterston A and Hunterston B nuclear power stations.

Architecture and description
The tower dates from the late 15th, or early 16th, centuries, although earlier buildings existed on the site. In the 17th century, a house was added to the tower to provide additional accommodation. In the 19th century, this was considered insufficient and a Neoclassical house, Hunterston House, was built to the north of the castle. In 1926 Robert Lorimer undertook an extensive restoration of the castle. It is a Category A listed building.

Public Access
Between 1974 and 1985 the castle was open to the general public daily however due to new rules and legislation by the nearby nuclear power stations they felt that having too many people in the nearby area would be a security risk but also impossible to evacuate them quickly in event of an emergency occurring at the stations. After this the castle was accessible on a case by case advance request visit only until 1994 when the castle became off limits to the public and only Clan Hunter members were allowed to visit. In the 2000s the castle was open one day a year as part of the opendays event, however this still caused problems due to the vicinity of the power stations so it was quietly dropped from future events and now reverted to Clan members only.
The castle can still be viewed externally by anyone passing by as its next to a public right of way and sustrans cycle route.

Notes

External links
Hunterston Castle

References
 

Castles in North Ayrshire
Category A listed buildings in North Ayrshire
Listed castles in Scotland
15th-century establishments in Scotland